Donnelly is an unincorporated community in Southeast Fairbanks Census Area, Alaska, United States.  Its elevation is 1,785 feet (544 m).  Located along the Richardson Highway 26 miles (42 km) south of Delta Junction, it was founded around 1904 as a telegraph station between Chitina and Fairbanks.  Donnelly's buildings during its early years were log constructed.

Demographics

Donnelly was incorporated as a city on December 15, 1960, too late to appear on the 1960 U.S. Census. It appeared once on the 1970 census with just seven residents. On March 7, 1974, it was dissolved as an inactive city (i.e. due to very low population). It has not appeared on the census since.

References

Former cities in Alaska
Unincorporated communities in Southeast Fairbanks Census Area, Alaska
Unincorporated communities in Alaska
Unincorporated communities in Unorganized Borough, Alaska
Populated places disestablished in 1974